Diary of a Wimpy Kid: Rodrick Rules is a 2011 American comedy film directed by David Bowers in his live-action directorial debut and based on Jeff Kinney's 2008 book of the same name. It stars Zachary Gordon and Devon Bostick. Robert Capron, Rachael Harris, Steve Zahn, and Peyton List also have prominent roles.

The film was released on March 25, 2011, by 20th Century Fox. It earned $72.4 million on a budget of $18–21 million. It is the second installment in the Diary of a Wimpy Kid film series, preceded by 2010's Diary of a Wimpy Kid. A sequel followed in 2012, Diary of a Wimpy Kid: Dog Days.

Plot

The Heffley family attends a back-to-school roller skating party, where Greg, now about to start seventh grade, meets a new girl named Holly Hills, whom he instantly develops a crush on.

The next day, a local talent show is advertised on TV, and Rodrick sees it as his band's big break. Susan, who writes a parenting column in the local paper, wants to get Greg and Rodrick to spend more time together and incentivizes them with money. However, at church the following Sunday, Rodrick stains Greg's pants with chocolate, humiliating Greg and causing a public scuffle between the two, ruining Susan’s reputation, and getting Greg and Rodrick banned from the family’s trip to a water park. Susan, Frank and Manny leave the two brothers home for the weekend to work on their differences, and are instructed not to invite anyone over. Ignoring this, Rodrick throws a wild party which Greg and Rowley end up participating in. The next morning, they receive a voicemail from their parents, informing them that they will be returning early from their trip, due to Manny being ill, prompting the brothers to hastily clean up the house. They find that someone wrote on the bathroom door in permanent marker. Greg gets the idea to replace it with the door to the basement, though after their family gets home, they realize that the replacement door does not have a lock.

Rodrick tells Greg to deny everything, but Susan soon realizes the lock is gone and confronts Greg over it. Greg confesses that he and Rodrick had people over, but lies, saying it was only a band practice and begs Susan to not punish Rodrick. Susan agrees to this, and Rodrick, believing that Greg kept their secret, gains respect for his younger brother. The two start spending more time together, and Rodrick gives Greg advice on school and girls, though most of it gets Greg in trouble.

One night, Susan and Frank end up finding pictures of Rodrick's party. Susan's reputation is ruined again. Greg is grounded for two weeks with no video games, while Rodrick is grounded for a month and forbidden from participating in the talent show, leaving him distraught. Having learned that Greg partially admitted the truth to Susan earlier on, Rodrick states that they may be brothers, but will never be friends. Greg and Rodrick are punished further by being forced to spend the weekend at their grandfather's retirement home, but Greg ends up running into Holly, and the two become friends.

At the talent show the next week, Rodrick finds out that he has been booted from his band by Bill Walter, a guitarist who recently joined; and Rowley is not able to perform his magic tricks due to his assistant having stage fright. Greg offers to participate in Rowley's magic act if Susan allows Rodrick to perform, which she agrees to. The magic act is praised by the crowd, including Holly, but people are unimpressed by Rodrick's band act until Susan starts dancing at the edge of the stage, which prompts the crowd to join in. Frank tapes the entire footage of Susan dancing, agreeing with Greg to keep it a secret. Rodrick removes Bill from the band in retaliation and reconciles with Greg.

In a mid-credit scene, Greg and Rowley upload the footage of Susan dancing to YouTube, which goes viral. Rodrick learns about this, and shouts “Greg, you are so dead!”.

Cast

 Zachary Gordon as Gregory "Greg" Heffley, the middle son of Susan and Frank and the brother of Rodrick and Manny.
 Devon Bostick as Rodrick Heffley, Greg and Manny's older brother and Susan and Frank’s oldest son who is a drummer and a bully.
 Conner Ingram as young Rodrick.
 Connor and Owen Fielding as Manny Heffley, Rodrick and Greg's younger brother and Susan and Frank’s youngest son who never gets into trouble.
 Robert Capron as Rowley Jefferson, Greg's childish best friend.
 Rachael Harris as  Susan Heffley, Rodrick, Greg, and Manny's mother.
 Steve Zahn as Frank Heffley, Rodrick, Greg, and Manny's father.
 Peyton List as  Holly Hills, Greg's love interest.
 Fran Kranz as Bill Walter, a brief new member of Rodrick's band whom Frank dislikes.
 Grayson Russell as Fregley, Greg's weird classmate.
 Karan Brar as Chirag Gupta, a friend of Greg's.
 Laine MacNeil as Patty Farrell, Greg's arch-enemy since kindergarten.
 John Shaw as Mr. Draybick, Greg's history teacher who used to have Rodrick as a student.
 Bryce Hodgson as Ben, one of Rodrick's friends.
 Terence Kelly as  Grandpa Heffley, Frank's father and Rodrick, Greg, and Manny's grandfather.
 Belita Moreno as Mrs. Norton, a drama teacher at Greg's school.
 Andrew McNee as Coach Malone, Greg's gym teacher.
 Alfred E. Humphreys as Mr. Jefferson, Rowley's father who dislikes Greg.
 Jakob Davies as Scotty Douglas, Rowley's former assistant who was replaced by Greg due to stage fright.
 Serge Houde as Mr. Salz, an editor for Susan's column. 
 Teryl Rothery as Mrs. Kohan, another editor for Susan's column.
 Kevin Kazakoff and Michelle Harrison as a rich couple with no children who appear in Greg's fantasy.
 Graeme Duffy as the Master of Ceremonies, a host for Plainview's Most Talented.
 Melissa Roxburgh as Rachel Lewis, one of the girls at Rodrick's house party.
 Dalila Bela as Taylor Pringle, a rude and unforgiving girl who celebrated her birthday at the roller rink at the beginning of the film.
 Ben Hollingsworth and Elysia Rotaru as Terence and Ingrid, a couple who appear in a horror movie called "The Foot", They are shown screaming with bad lip movements.
 Brenda Anderson, Doreen Ramus, Betty Phillips, Tae Helgeth, Sheila Paterson and Monica Marko as Mrs. Fiorkowski, Mrs. Cabbage, Mrs. Evesham, Mrs. Tan, Mrs. Bingham and Mrs. Anholtz, respectively, old women in the ladies' restroom who think Greg is a Peeping Tom.
 Jeff Kinney, the series' author, makes a cameo as Holly's father.

A young Billie Eilish provides additional voices.

Production
Brad Simpson stated he anticipated a sequel movie if the first film is a success. "Our writing staff are writing a sequel right now, "Rodrick Rules," which would be based on the second book"..."And, you know, we hope that the people to see a second movie, so that we are in position of going again right away and making another film. I certainly know that the fans would like to see all the books made into movies." Fox 2000 greenlit the sequel and Zachary Gordon returned as Greg Heffley. Steve Zahn (Frank Heffley) and Rachael Harris (Susan Heffley) also returned. The film was directed by David Bowers and the screenplay was written by Gabe Sachs and Jeff Judah. Principal photography began in Vancouver August 2010. A few new characters appeared in the film, including Peyton List as Holly Hills. The trailer was seen with Gulliver's Travels. The website created for the first was updated for the sequel featuring pictures of the cast and a short synopsis of the film. The film was released on March 25, 2011. Talks of a sequel were announced after the release of the first, but was not officially announced until May 12, 2010, announcing that it would be released March 25, 2011. Filming took place in Vancouver, British Columbia and New Westminster, British Columbia from August 23 to October 27, 2010. The mall scene was filmed at Park Royal Mall in West Vancouver. The roller rink scene was filmed at the PNE Agrodome, due to Vancouver lacking a real roller rink. Director Thor Freudenthal was replaced by director David Bowers (director of Flushed Away by Aardman, the creators of Wallace and Gromit, and the film adaptation of anime cybernetic superhero kid Astro Boy).

Marketing and release
The trailer was shown with Gulliver's Travels on December 25, 2010. It was later online on January 3, 2011. A poster was released there after on January 14, 2011. In February 2011, an exclusive online-only trailer was released on the "Wimpy Kid Movie" YouTube channel, officialwimpmovie. Due to the success of the first film in Singapore, the film was released there eight days before the US release on March 17, 2011. The film was released in Brazil on September 16, 2011. A TV spot of the movie was released in March 2011.

Home media
The film was released on a stand-alone DVD, a special edition double DVD pack, and a Blu-ray/DVD/digital copy combo pack on June 21, 2011. One of the bonus shorts was shown during iParty with Victorious on Nickelodeon at 8:00 PM on June 11, 2011.

Reception

Box office
The film made $7.3 million on its opening day, ranking #2 behind Sucker Punch. It managed to rank #1 in the weekend box office. In the UK, it debuted at #3 in the weekend box office behind Pirates of the Caribbean: On Stranger Tides and The Hangover Part II.
The film eventually grossed $52,698,535 in the US and Canada and $19,718,859 in other countries for a worldwide total of $72,417,394.

Critical response
On Rotten Tomatoes, the film has an approval rating of 47% based on 100 reviews and an average rating of 5.4/10. The site's critical consensus reads, "Moderately witty and acceptably acted, Diary of a Wimpy Kid 2 isn't much worse than the first installment." On Metacritic, it has a score of 51 out of 100 based on 23 critics, indicating "mixed or average reviews". Audiences polled by CinemaScore gave it an average grade of "A−" on an A+ to F scale.

Robert Abele of the Los Angeles Times gave the film a positive review saying, "Director David Bowers keeps things peppy and brightly lighted, but the movie's swiftest pleasures come from moment-seizing cast members." Richard Roeper of the Chicago Sun-Times gave it a positive review saying, "A little less wimpy, gives value lessons to the watchers from the cast, and still pretty funny" and a B rating. Pete Hammond of Boxoffice magazine gave it a mixed review stating "Even better than the first edition, in its own sitcom-ish ways." However, Michael O'Sullivan of The Washington Post gave it a negative review, stating "You can't fault the filmmakers for reshaping a diary into a cohesive film. You can however, fault them for taking one of the great antiheroes in preteen literature and turning him into, well, an even wimpier kid."

Accolades

Animated remake 

On October 23, 2021, Jeff Kinney revealed that sequels to the 2021 Diary of a Wimpy Kid reboot film for Disney+ are already in development. On Disney+ Day 2021, Kinney revealed that the first sequel, based on Rodrick Rules, is set to be released in 2022. A poster was released on September 12th, 2022, announcing the film’s release date of December 2, 2022.

References

External links

 
 
 Diary of a Wimpy Kid: Rodrick Rules at the TCM Movie Database
 

Diary of a Wimpy Kid (film series)
2011 films
2010s English-language films
2010s children's comedy films
20th Century Fox films
American films with live action and animation
American children's comedy films
American sequel films
Dune Entertainment films
Films about brothers
Films scored by Edward Shearmur
Films directed by David Bowers
Films shot in Vancouver
2011 comedy films
Middle school films
2010s American films
Films about dysfunctional families